Tui or TUI may refer to:

Places
 Tui, Pontevedra, Spain 
 Tui, Iran, West Azerbaijan Province, Iran
 Tui, North Khorasan, North Khorasan Province, Iran
 Tui Province, Burkina Faso
 Tuis District, Costa Rica
 Tui railway station, New Zealand

Computing
 Tangible user interface, in which people interact with digital information through the physical environment
 Text-based user interface, as distinct from a graphical user interface
 Touch user interface, a computer-pointing technology

Organisations
 TUI Group, a tour operator
 TUIfly, several airlines owned by TUI Group
 TUI Travel, a British leisure travel group that merged with TUI Group
 North Tui Sports, a 1930s New Zealand aircraft
 Teachers' Union of Ireland, a trade union
 Trident University International, an online university in the United States

Other uses
 Tūī, a New Zealand native bird
 Tui (name), a Polynesian given name and surname
 Tui (beer), a brand of beer, named after the bird
 Tui (intellectual), a neologism coined by Bertolt Brecht to describe a type of intellectual, as depicted in his play Turandot
 Tu'i, a title of nobility in Polynesia and Melanesia
 Tui Awards, New Zealand music awards
 Tui mine, New Zealand
 Tui Regio, a region on Saturn's moon Titan
 Turaif Domestic Airport (IATA code), Saudi Arabia
 HMNZS Tui, two ships that served in the Royal New Zealand Navy
 Tuis (magazine), a South African magazine published by Media24

See also
 Tuy (disambiguation)